Porcellio normani is a species of woodlouse in the genus Porcellio belonging to the family Porcellionidae that can be found on Madeira.

References

Crustaceans described in 1899
Endemic fauna of Madeira
Porcellionidae
Woodlice of Europe